"Saving the World" is a song by Brooke Fraser, released as the third single from Fraser's debut album, What to Do with Daylight, in 2004. "Saving the World" is a song about avoiding apathy in a relationship by discussing one's religious belief or faith.

The song debuted on the New Zealand Singles Chart on March 21, 2004, at number forty nine and peaked at number fifteen ten weeks later. It spent a total of fifteen weeks on the chart.

Track listing
"Saving the World"
"Better" (Live version)
"Without You" (Live version)

Charts

References

2004 singles
Brooke Fraser songs
Songs written by Brooke Fraser
2003 songs
Columbia Records singles